Martin Albertsen (born 10 April 1978) is a Danish handball coach for the Swiss women's national handball team and the junior national team.

He qualified the Swiss team for their first international competition at the 2022 European Women's Handball Championship in North Macedonia, Slovenia and Montenegro. Despite the qualification, they were eliminated in the preliminary round.

In 2002 and 2004 he managed to win the Danish Women's Handball League with Viborg HK, as his first professional coaching job. Albertsen also won the Handball-Bundesliga Frauen in 2006 and with SG BBM Bietigheim in 2017 and 2019. He also qualified the Bietigheim team for the 2016–17 Women's EHF Cup final.

References

Danish male handball players
Danish handball coaches
Living people
1978 births
Handball coaches of international teams